Ain't Misbehavin' is an EP by the British hard rock band UFO, recorded in 1987 after the band's USA tour, and released early in 1988.

Track listing

Personnel
UFO
Phil Mogg – vocals
Paul Gray – bass guitar
Tommy McClendon (aka Atomik Tommy M) – guitar, backing vocals
Jim Simpson – drums, backing vocals
? – keyboards

Production
Neil Levine – executive producer, engineer, mixing
Alan Cave – engineer, mixing
John Shaw – engineer, mixing

References

1988 EPs
UFO (band) EPs
Metal Blade Records EPs